Michael S. Sherry (born 1945) is an American historian, and professor of history emeritus at Northwestern University.

Life
He graduated from Washington University in St. Louis summa cum laude, and from Yale University with an MA and Ph.D. in 1975.

Awards
 1988 Bancroft Prize
2008 LGBT Award for Nonfiction from the Lambda Literary Foundation

Works
 The Punitive Turn in American Life: How the United States Learned to Fight Crime Like a War (UNC Press Books, 2020). online reviews
 "Patriotic orthodoxy and American decline." in Living with the Bomb: American and Japanese Cultural Conflicts in the Nuclear Age (Taylor and Francis, 2015) pp. 134–152.
 "The United States and Strategic Bombing: From Prophecy to Memory." in Bombing Civilians: A Twentieth-Century History (Free Press, 2008).
 

 "Patriotic orthodoxy and US decline." Bulletin of Concerned Asian Scholars 27.2 (1995): 19-25. online
 "The language of war in AIDS discourse." in Writing AIDS: gay literature, language, and analysis (1993): 39-53.
 “War and Weapons: The New Cultural History.” Diplomatic History 14#3 1990, pp. 433–46, online

 "The Military." American Quarterly 35.1/2 (1983): 59-79. online
 Preparing For the Next War: American Plans for Postwar Defense, 1941-45 (Yale UP, 1977)
  “Making Military Policy and Military History.” American Quarterly 28#5 1976, pp. 589–600, online

References

External links

"Review:The Rise of American Airpower", Bulletin of the Atomic Scientists October 1987

21st-century American historians
21st-century American male writers
Northwestern University faculty
Washington University in St. Louis alumni
Yale University alumni
Living people
Lambda Literary Award winners
Bancroft Prize winners
American male non-fiction writers
1945 births